Willard Samuel Langton (February 26, 1872 – February 22, 1915) was a college mathematics professor and an American football coach. He served as the head football coach at Utah State University–then known as Utah Agricultural College–in Logan, Utah from 1899 to 1900, compiling a record of 1–2. He was working at Columbia University in New York City at the time of his death in 1915.

Head coaching record

References

External links
 

1872 births
1915 deaths
Utah State Aggies football coaches
People from Smithfield, Utah